Brunei and Malaysia established diplomatic relations in 1984. Brunei has a high commission in Putrajaya, as well as consulate-generals in Kota Kinabalu and Kuching. Malaysia maintains a high commission in Bandar Seri Begawan. Both countries are full members of ASEAN and the Commonwealth of Nations. The two countries share a land border on the island of Borneo.

Country comparison

History 
Relations between the two countries has been established since January 1984.

Cultural links 
Brunei and Malaysia have many similarities in culture especially in the East Malaysian areas as they were once a part of the Bruneian Empire. In 2011, around 61,470 Bruneians visited Malaysia while Brunei received 1,238,871 Malaysian tourists in 2013.

Transport links 
The states of Sarawak and Sabah in East Malaysia are connected to Brunei via the Pan Borneo Highway through the Brunei–Malaysia Friendship Bridge.

Disputes 
Before 2009, Malaysia's land boundary with Brunei around Limbang was in dispute. Brunei and Malaysia agreed to cease gas and oil exploration in their disputed offshore and deep water seabeds until negotiations progressed into an agreement over allocation of disputed areas in 2003. In March 2009, it seemed a solution was achieved between the two governments when the Malaysian press reported that Brunei dropped all claims to Limbang, thus recognising it as a Malaysian territory. Brunei however immediately denied Malaysian press reports, saying the Limbang Question was never discussed during negotiations for the Exchange of Letters.

See also 
 Bruneian Malay people
 Brunei–Malaysia border

References 

 
Bilateral relations of Malaysia 
Malaysia
Malaysia
Brunei